Laurentius Petri Nericius (1499 – 27 October 1573) was a Swedish clergyman and the first Evangelical Lutheran Archbishop of Sweden. He and his brother Olaus Petri are, together with the King Gustav Vasa, regarded as the main Lutheran reformers of Sweden. They are commemorated by the Evangelical Lutheran Church in America on 19 April.

Early life 
Laurentius was born Lars Persson in Örebro, Närke. Laurentius studied in Germany in 1520, possibly together with his brother. Here they took influence from Lutheranism, among other things they met with Martin Luther himself. On returning home to Stockholm, they got stranded and nearly lost their lives as the boat went ashore on the island of Gotland. They both survived however, and settled on the island, and Laurentius became headmaster at a school while Olaus became assistant to a priest. Not long after, Olaus travelled with the priest to Stockholm and the crowning of King Gustav Vasa. Subsequently, he managed to get on friendly terms with the King, and soon moved to Stockholm where he worked in the vicinity of the King.

Archbishop 
At the Uppsala Council 1531, the Swedish King Gustav Vasa took the final step of breaking with the Roman Catholic Church, by personally appointing Laurentius as the new archbishop. On 22 September that year, Laurentius was consecrated archbishop by the Peder Månsson, Bishop of Västerås. Månsson was ordained bishop in Rome by Bishop Paris de Grassis, and by consecrating Laurentius the apostolic succession was retained in the Church of Sweden, which was considered important. But although the consecration took place according to Catholic ritual, those who officiated at the consecration made a secret declaration that they were acting under pressure.

Later that year Laurentius married  Elisabeth Didriksdotter, a daughter of the King's cousin becoming the first Swedish archbishop to be married. His brother Olaus had already become the first priest to marry in 1525.

The king forbade Laurentius to interfere with the reformation plans. Laurentius wisely defended the autonomy of the Church against the various ideas of Gustav, such as his wish to abolish all bishops, while still steady advancing and promoting the ideas of the reformation texts within Sweden. His main contribution were his abundant writings which laid the foundation for the Swedish Church Ordinance established at the Uppsala Council 1571.

He was archbishop for 42 years, unparalleled in Sweden, and during his time he was often in conflicts with the monarchs. In 1539 his brother Olaus was sentenced to death by the King over some arguments, and Laurentius was among those forced to sign the death sentence. It has been disputed whether Laurentius was doing this because of a weak character or if he thought it better to formally obey so that he could continue to spread the reformation ideas. Olaus did eventually get pardoned in 1542, much due to his influential friends, but he was forced to keep a low profile, leaving the role of main reformator solely to Laurentius.

Diplomat

Gustav I of Sweden entrusted Laurentius Petri to head the delegation who negotiated the Treaty of Novgorod (1557), which ended the Russo-Swedish War (1554–1557).

Works 
The first complete Swedish translation of the Bible was published in 1541, nicknamed the Vasa Bible after the King. Laurentius was one of the main proponents supervising the project, together with his brother Olaus and the clergyman Laurentius Andreae.

In the 1560s, when the ideas of Calvin gained in influence, Laurentius published several texts where he spoke for Lutheranism. It has been suggested that it was the first time the Swedish Church defined its Lutheran character.

Family 
His wife was Elizabeth Diriksdotter daughter of Didrik the Mint Master and Birgitta Kristiernsdotter Vasa (paternal cousin of Gustav I of Sweden). They were betrothed on 23 September 1531, after Laurentius Petri married Gustav I of Sweden to Catherine of Saxe-Lauenburg. Two daughters were born in the marriage: Margaret, who married Laurentius Petri Gothus (They had two daughters) and Magdalene, who married Abraham Angermannus.

Notes and references 

 Article Laurentius Petri in Nordisk familjebok (1911)

External links 

 Olaus Petri and Laurentius Petri

1499 births
1573 deaths
People from Örebro
Lutheran archbishops of Uppsala
16th-century Lutheran archbishops
Protestant Reformers
People celebrated in the Lutheran liturgical calendar
Burials at Uppsala Cathedral
16th-century Swedish people
Translators of the Bible into Swedish
Swedish Reformation